The flag of Bonaire, adopted in 1981, represents a Dutch island in the Caribbean Netherlands. Bonaire commemorates Flag Day on September 6 annually, the traditional date Europeans first arrived on the island. The professional vexillologist Whitney Smith was involved in developing Bonaire's flag. 

The flag has a large dark blue band in the lower right corner and a smaller yellow band in the upper left corner. The dark blue and yellow bands represent the sea and sun respectively while the dividing white strip represents the sky. The yellow band was formerly red as a reference to the Dutch flag, but was changed at some point to avoid having two separated sections of red (from the star). The coloured bands are separated by a white strip, inside of which is a black compass and a red six-pointed star.

The black compass represents the population of Bonaire as a seafaring people, while the arrows adjuting it symbolises equality in the four cardinal directions of the compass. The red six-pointed star represents the original six villages of Bonaire: Antriol, Nikiboko, Nort Saliña, Playa, Rincon and Tera Korá.

See also
Flag of Netherlands Antilles

References

Flags of the Netherlands Antilles
Bonaire
Flags introduced in 1981
1981 establishments in the Netherlands Antilles